Joanne Woollard (died 27 February 2015) was a British art director. She was nominated for an Academy Award in the category Best Art Direction for the film Hope and Glory. She got her 2nd nomination in 2013 for Gravity.

Selected filmography
 Hope and Glory (1987)
 Gravity (2013)

References

External links

Year of birth missing
2015 deaths
British art directors